This is a season-by-season list of records compiled by Michigan in men's ice hockey.

The University of Michigan has won nine NCAA Championship in its history, more than any other program and is tied with Minnesota for the most NCAA tournament appearances (as of 2021).

Season-by-season results

Note: GP = Games played, W = Wins, L = Losses, T = Ties

* Winning percentage is used when conference schedules are unbalanced.† Wilf Martin resigned after 2 games due to ill health.

Footnotes

References

Lists of college men's ice hockey seasons in the United States
Michigan Wolverines ice hockey seasons
Michigan Wolverines men's ice hockey seasons